The Canton of Boussac is a canton situated in the Creuse département and in the Nouvelle-Aquitaine region of central France.

Geography 
An area of farming and forestry in the arrondissement of Guéret, centred on the town of Boussac. The altitude varies from 298m (Malleret-Boussac) to 656m (Toulx-Sainte-Croix)
with an average altitude of 458m.

Population

Composition 
At the French canton reorganisation which came into effect in March 2015, the canton was expanded from 13 to 17 communes:
 
Bétête
Bord-Saint-Georges
Boussac
Boussac-Bourg
Bussière-Saint-Georges
Clugnat
Jalesches
Lavaufranche
Leyrat
Malleret-Boussac
Nouzerines
Saint-Marien
Saint-Pierre-le-Bost
Saint-Silvain-Bas-le-Roc
Soumans 
Toulx-Sainte-Croix
Tercillat

See also 
 Arrondissements of the Creuse department
 Cantons of the Creuse department
 Communes of the Creuse department

References

Boussac